The Sierra Leonean Ambassador to Germany is the official representative of the Government of Sierra Leone to the Government of Germany.

List of representatives

References 

Ambassadors of Sierra Leone to Germany
Germany
Sierra Leone